Cnemidophorus murinus, known commonly as Laurenti's whiptail, is a species of lizard in the family Teiidae (whiptails). The species is endemic to Curacao, and is oviparous.

References

Further reading
Harvey, Michael B.; Ugueto, Gabriel N.; Gutberlet, Ronald L., Jr. (2012). "Review of Teiid Morphology with a Revised Taxonomy and Phylogeny of the Teiidae (Lepidosauria: Squamata)". Zootaxa 3459: 1–156. (Cnemidophorus murinus, p. 10).
Laurenti JN (1768). Specimen medicum, exhibens synopsin reptilium emendatam cum experimentis circa venena et antidota reptilium austriacorum. Vienna: "Joan. Thom. Nob. de Trattnern". 214 pp. + Plates I-V. (Seps murinus, new species, p. 63). (in Latin).
Wagler J (1830). Natürliches System der AMPHIBIEN, mit vorangehender Classification der SÄUGTHIERE und VÖGEL. Ein Beitrag zur vergleichenden Zoologie. Munich, Stuttgart and Tübingen: J.G. Cotta. vi + 354 pp. + one plate. (Cnemidophorus murinus, new combination, p. 154). (in German and Latin).

Cnemidophorus
Reptiles described in 1768
Reptiles of the Caribbean
Fauna of the Dutch Caribbean
Fauna of the Netherlands Antilles
Taxa named by Josephus Nicolaus Laurenti